The 2015 Campeonato da Primeira Divisão de Futebol Profissional da FGF (2015 FGF First Division Professional Football Championship), better known as the 2015 Campeonato Gaúcho or  Gaúcho, was the 95th edition of the top flight football league of the Brazilian state of Rio Grande do Sul. The season began on 31 January and ended on 3 May, with the second leg of final. The 16 clubs contested in the Campeonato Gaúcho (Championship A1 Series). Internacional successfully defended its 2014 title.

In the 2015 season finals, the two top ranked clubs in the state league (Grêmio and Internacional) qualified, reissuing the Grenal in the championship decision after both clubs narrowly escaped elimination in the quarterfinals. In the opening match of the finals, the game ended in a 0–0 draw at Arena do Grêmio. Along with the two finalists, Brasil also qualified for the next season Copa do Brasil. Ypiranga-RS qualified for the Campeonato Brasileiro Série D at this season, for being the best placed team without national division. Meanwhile, Caxias, União Frederiquense and Avenida were the three bottom ranked teams and were relegated for the 2016 season to the Campeonato Gaúcho Série A2.

Michel easily won the scoring title with 11 goals Passo Fundo failed to qualify for the knockout phase. The goalkeeper Carlão, of Ypiranga-RS, led the championship with 9 clean sheets, while Marcelo Grohe, of Grêmio, finished with 8.

Format 
The sixteen participating clubs plays each other in a single round. The top eight teams qualified to the play-offs. The bottom three teams in the overall standings were relegated.

Clubs 
The following 16 clubs contested in the 2015 Campeonato Gaúcho.

First stage

Standings

Knockout phase

Quarter-finals

Standings

Matches

Semi-finals

Standings 

|}

Matches

Finals

Standings 

|}

Matches

Overall table 
Unlike 2014, the overall table considers the matches played during all stages and the first criterion for the position is stage. In order to reduce the number of participants from 16 to 12 (14 in 2016) three teams that would be relegated to play Série A2 in 2016 and only one team would be promoted to the first division. The best placed team not playing in Campeonato Brasileiro Série A (Grêmio and Internacional), Série B or Série C (Brasil (PE), Caxias and Juventude)  and the 2014 Super Copa Gaúcha champions Lajeadense will be "promoted" to Série D. The best three teams will qualify for 2016 Copa do Brasil.

Records and statistics

Goalscorers 
This is the list of goalscorers in the 2015 Campeonato Gaúcho. Players and teams in bold are still active in the competition.

References 

Campeonato Gaúcho seasons